Danguolė Rasalaitė (19 May 1983 – 10 January 2000) was a Lithuanian girl who was sold as a sex-slave in Sweden in late 1999. Her mother had abandoned her when she was 14 years old and left for the USA. When she was 15-16 years old, she was sent from Lithuania by an older man who pretended to be her boyfriend. He promised her a job as a berry picker in Sweden and gave her a fake passport. When she arrived in Sweden, a man welcomed her and locked her in an apartment in Malmö. He said she had to pay him 20,000 kronor for her passport and the transportation from Lithuania to Sweden. She soon understood she would be working as a prostitute.

Rasalaitė was forced to work as a prostitute for two weeks before she escaped the apartment she was imprisoned in. On 7 January 2000, she jumped off a bridge in Malmö after escaping from the apartment and getting raped by a group of men who pretended they would help her. She died three days later at a hospital. Her case stirred much debate on human trafficking.

The 2002 film Lilya 4-ever is loosely based on her life.

References 

1983 births
2000 deaths
People from Telšiai
Prostitution in Sweden